The Bishop of Hexham and Newcastle is the Ordinary of the Roman Catholic Diocese of Hexham and Newcastle in the Province of Liverpool, known also on occasion as the Northern Province.

History

With the gradual abolition of the legal restrictions on the activities of Catholics in England and Wales in the early 19th century, Rome decided to proceed to bridge the gap of the centuries from Queen Elizabeth I by instituting Catholic dioceses on the regular historical pattern. Thus Pope Pius IX issued the Bull Universalis Ecclesiae of 29 September 1850 by which thirteen new dioceses which did not formally claim any continuity with the pre-Elizabethan English dioceses were created. The Vicariate Apostolic of the Northern District was duly elevated to diocese status as the Diocese of Hexham.

On 23 May 1861 the diocese became the Diocese of Hexham and Newcastle. In the early period from 1850 the diocese was a suffragan of the Metropolitan See of Westminster, but under Pope Pius X, on 28 October 1911, it was assigned to the newly created Province of Liverpool.

Current situation

The present diocese covers an area of 7,700 km2 of the counties of Northumberland, Tyne and Wear, Durham and that part of Cleveland which is north of the River Tees. The see is in the City of Newcastle upon Tyne where the seat is located at the Cathedral Church of Saint Mary, which was consecrated on 21 August 1860.

The Bishop's residence was formerly Bishop's House, East Denton Hall, Newcastle upon Tyne. It is now at West Avenue, Gosforth, Newcastle upon Tyne.

The Right Reverend Séamus Cunningham, who was appointed the 13th Bishop of Hexham and Newcastle by Pope Benedict XVI on 9 January 2009. He had previously served as Vicar General and Diocesan Administrator. He was ordained on 20 March 2009, the Feast of Saint Cuthbert, patron of the diocese. Retired at the age of 76 in February 2019.

The previous bishop is the Right Reverend Robert Byrne. He was installed on 25 March 2019 in St Mary's Cathedral, Newcastle upon Tyne. Bishop Byrne submitted his resignation early, at the age of 66, citing that his episcopal ministry had become "too great a burden." His resignation was accepted by the Holy See on 12 December 2022.

Past and present ordinaries 

From 1850 to 1861 the title was Bishop of Hexham, and since 1861 it has been Bishop of Hexham and Newcastle.
By the decree of 29 September 1850 by Pope Pius IX, the Roman Catholic hierarchy was restored in England and Wales. Much of the Vicariate Apostolic of the Northern District of England became the Diocese of Hexham, and the Vicar Apostolic of the district became the Bishop of Hexham. The Diocese of Hexham comprised Northumberland, County Durham, Cumberland and Westmorland. The patrons of the diocese were Our Blessed Lady Immaculate and St Cuthbert.

On 22 April 1861, the Propaganda congregation decreed that St Mary's Cathedral, Newcastle upon Tyne should be the bishop's seat, and the Episcopal see should be renamed the Diocese of Hexham and Newcastle. The decree was approved by Pope Pius IX on 7 March, and was expedited on 23 May 1861.

Bibliography

References

Hexham and Newcastle